The men's 100 metres event at the 1987 Summer Universiade was held at the Stadion Maksimir in Zagreb on 13 and 14 July 1987.

Medalists

Results

Heats
Wind:Heat 1: +1.0 m/s, Heat 3: +1.0 m/s, Heat 5: +0.7 m/s, Heat 9: -0.6 m/s

Quarterfinals
Wind:Heat 3: +1.0 m/s

Semifinals
Wind:Heat 1: -1.1 m/s, Heat 2: ?

Final

Wind: +0.5 m/s

References

Athletics at the 1987 Summer Universiade
1987